Huntonia is a monotypic genus of isopods belonging to the family Philosciidae. The only species is Huntonia montana.

References

Woodlice
Isopod genera
Monotypic crustacean genera